The 11th Arizona State Legislature, consisting of the Arizona State Senate and the Arizona House of Representatives, was constituted from January 1, 1933, to December 31, 1934, during Benjamin Baker Moeur's first term as Governor of Arizona, in Phoenix. The number in both houses remained constant, with 19 senators and 63 representatives. The Democrats held every seat in the Senate, and increased the large majority they held the house.

Sessions
The Legislature met for the regular session at the State Capitol in Phoenix on January 12, 1933; and adjourned on March 14. There were 3 special sessions of this legislature during 1933–34. The third special session ran from November 26 – December 14, 1934.

State Senate

Members

The asterisk (*) denotes members of the previous Legislature who continued in office as members of this Legislature.

Employees
The following held unelected positions within the Legislature:

 Secretary: William J. Graham
 Sergeant-at-Arms: Frank J. Gillick
 Chaplain: Thomas C. Harris

House of Representatives

Members
The asterisk (*) denotes members of the previous Legislature who continued in office as members of this Legislature.

Employees
The following held unelected positions within the Legislature:

 Chief Clerk: Lallah Ruth
 Assistant Chief Clerk: Ruby Coulter
 Sergeant-at-Arms: Thomas Cowperthwaite
 Chaplain: Reverend Thomas C. Harris

References

Arizona legislative sessions
1933 in Arizona
1934 in Arizona
1933 U.S. legislative sessions
1934 U.S. legislative sessions